Nursing Personnel Convention, 1977 is  an International Labour Organization Convention.

It was established in 1977, with the preamble stating:
Having decided upon the adoption of certain proposals with regard to employment and conditions of work and life of nursing personnel,...

Ratifications
As of 2023, the convention had been ratified by 41 states.

External links 
Text.
Ratifications.

International Labour Organization conventions
Nursing
Treaties concluded in 1977
Treaties entered into force in 1979
Treaties of Azerbaijan
Treaties of Bangladesh
Treaties of the Byelorussian Soviet Socialist Republic
Treaties of Belgium
Treaties of the Republic of the Congo
Treaties of Denmark
Treaties of Ecuador
Treaties of Egypt
Treaties of El Salvador
Treaties of Fiji
Treaties of Finland
Treaties of France
Treaties of Ghana
Treaties of Greece
Treaties of Guatemala
Treaties of Guinea
Treaties of Guyana
Treaties of Ba'athist Iraq
Treaties of Italy
Treaties of Jamaica
Treaties of Kenya
Treaties of Kyrgyzstan
Treaties of Latvia
Treaties of Lithuania
Treaties of Luxembourg
Treaties of Malawi
Treaties of Malta
Treaties of Norway
Treaties of the Philippines
Treaties of the Polish People's Republic
Treaties of the Soviet Union
Treaties of Portugal
Treaties of Seychelles
Treaties of Slovenia
Treaties of Sweden
Treaties of Tajikistan
Treaties of Tanzania
Treaties of the Ukrainian Soviet Socialist Republic
Treaties of Uruguay
Treaties of Venezuela
Treaties of Zambia
Health treaties
1977 in labor relations